Connie Conley is an American para-alpine skier. She represented the United States at the 1984 Winter Paralympics in alpine skiing. She won a medal in each event that she competed in.

She won the silver medal in the Women's Giant Slalom B2 event and the bronze medals at the Women's Downhill B2 event and Women's Alpine Combination B2 event.

See also 
 List of Paralympic medalists in alpine skiing

References 

Living people
Year of birth missing (living people)
Place of birth missing (living people)
Paralympic alpine skiers of the United States
American female alpine skiers
Alpine skiers at the 1984 Winter Paralympics
Medalists at the 1984 Winter Paralympics
Paralympic silver medalists for the United States
Paralympic bronze medalists for the United States
Paralympic medalists in alpine skiing
21st-century American women